Cornel may refer to:


People
 Cornel (given name), a list of people with the given name or nickname
 Cornel Wilde (1915–1989), American actor and director born Kornél Lajos Weisz
 Eric Cornel (born 1996), Canadian hockey player

Plants
Several species of the dogwood family:
 Cornus amomum, also known as the silky cornel
 Cornus canadensis, Canadian dwarf cornel
 Cornus mas, Cornelian cherry or European cornel
 Cornus officinalis, Japanese cornel or Japanese cornelian cherry
 Cornus suecica, dwarf cornel
 Cornus capitata, Bentham's cornel

Ships
 HMS Cornel (K-278), a British corvette transferred to the US Navy as USS Alacrity (PG-87)
 USS Cornel (AN-45), a net-laying ship that served in the Pacific theater during World War II

See also
 Cornell (disambiguation)